Labdia bryomima is a moth in the family Cosmopterigidae. It is found in Australia, where it has been recorded from New South Wales.

References

External links
Natural History Museum Lepidoptera generic names catalog

Labdia 
Moths described in 1897